This article details the Bradford Bulls rugby league football club's 2023 season. This is the Bulls' fifth consecutive season in the Championship.

Season review

July 2022

Loose forward Ben Evans signed a 2 year deal with Barrow Raiders for next season. Prop Daniel Fleming left the Bulls to join promotion chasing Featherstone Rovers.

August 2022

On loan second row forward Chester Butler became the first signing of the 2023 season as it was announced that he would leave the Huddersfield Giants to sign a 2 year deal at the Bulls. The second signing of the season came in the form of experienced RFL Championship winger Ben Blackmore from Dewsbury Rams on a 1 year deal. Halfback Tom Holmes from Featherstone Rovers became the third signing for the 2023 season.

September 2022

Second row Brad England signed a 1 year extension to his contract to keep him at the club for the 2023 season. The Bulls signed prop/loose forward Brad Foster on a 1 year deal from fellow RFL Championship side London Broncos. Club captain Steve Crossley announced that he would leave the club at the end of his contract and would eventually sign for RFL League 1 side Hunslet R.L.F.C.. Veteran second rower Aaron Murphy signed a contract with Sheffield Eagles for the 2023 season. Young hooker Thomas Doyle signed a 2 year contract with RFL League 1 champions and recently promoted Keighley Cougars whilst veteran hooker George Flanagan signed a new 1 year extension to stay at the Bulls. Winger David Foggin-Johnston signed an extension to his contract keeping him at the club for the 2023 season. Joe Burton became the latest member of the squad to leave as he signed up with RFL League 1 side Hunslet R.L.F.C.. Championship second-row stalwart Sam Scott signed a 1 year extension with the club following an injury ravaged season.

October 2022

Prop forward Anthony Walker joined former coach John Kear as he signed a deal to play for Widnes Vikings for 2023. Winger Matty Dawson-Jones signed a two year deal with fellow RFL Championship side Sheffield Eagles. The Bulls announced a shock signing in the form of 2017 Super League Grand Final winner Jack Walker on a one year permanent contract from Leeds Rhinos. Bradford also announced the signing of prop forward Dalton Desmond-Walker from 2022 RFL League 1 winner Keighley Cougars. The Bulls recruitment continued with the signing of seasoned professional Bodene Thompson, the New Zealand born second rower joined from local rivals Leeds Rhinos on a one year deal. Prop forward Michael Hoyle signed a one year extension to keep him at the club, meanwhile Elliot Kear joined Batley Bulldogs for the 2023 season. Former Dewsbury Rams coach Lee Greenwood joined the club as Mark Dunning's assistant coach for the upcoming season. Loose Forward Sam Hallas joined Australian side Kurri Kurri Bulldogs for the 2023 season.

November 2022

Bradford's recruitment continued with the signing of centre Max Clarke on a short-term deal from Hull F.C.. Welsh centre Rhys Evans announced his retirement from rugby league. After spending much of 2022 on loan, fullback Elliot Hall signed for Doncaster R.L.F.C. on a permanent deal. The 2023 fixtures were released and it was revealed that the Bulls would host Whitehaven R.L.F.C. in the opening game and would face local rivals Keighley Cougars in this seasons Summer Bash. The Bulls announced the signing of two young players on a season long loan from Huddersfield Giants, the first being hooker George Roby and also prop Fenton Rodgers. Huddersfield Giants prop forward Michael Lawrence joined the Bulls on a two year deal. Prop Samy Kibula departed the club and joined Batley Bulldogs for the 2023 season. Winger Ryan Millar left the club by mutual consent and he eventually joined Widnes Vikings. The Bulls signed Papua New Guinea second-row international Keven Appo after impressing at the 2021 Rugby League World Cup.

December 2022

The Bulls announced that they would face Huddersfield Giants in a pre-season friendly on 22 January 2023 at Odsal Stadium and also will play Dewsbury Rams at Crown Flatt on 15 January 2023.  The final friendly was announced as the Bulls will face Leeds Rhinos on the 29 January 2023 at Headingley Stadium in a new annual fixture for the Keith Howard Foundation trophy. Coach Dunning revealed that prop forward Michael Lawrence would be the captain for the 2023 season while Bodene Thompson would be the vice captain. It was announced that emerging young talent George Flanagan Jr would sign for Huddersfield Giants at the end of 2023 for the 2024 season for a fee of around £85,000. New prop forward Dalton Desmond-Walker announced his shock departure via social media after spending only two months with the club.

January 2023

To start the new year off the Bulls announced the signing of centre Joe Arundel following his departure from Halifax Panthers. The 2023 squad numbers were revealed with notable numbers being taken, fullback Jack Walker took the number 31 shirt (the one he debuted with for Leeds Rhinos) rather than the traditional number 1. Captain Michael Lawrence will wear the number 10 shirt whilst George Flanagan would wear the number 9. Second rower Sam Scott announced he was retiring immediately after failing to overcome a recurring injury. Bradford started their pre-season with a convincing 34-16 win over Dewsbury Rams, new signings Brad Foster, Joe Arundel and Jack Walker all crossed for tries whilst young half Myles Lawford kicked five goals as well as scoring a try himself. The scheduled friendly against Huddersfield Giants was cancelled due to a frozen pitch. After the departure of Desmond-Walker and the retirement of Scott, Bradford bolstered their pack by signing experienced forward Josh Johnson from Widnes Vikings. The Bulls finished pre-season with a 24-10 loss to local rivals Leeds Rhinos.

February 2023

The Bulls began the 2023 RFL Championship season with a comfortable 24-8 win over Whitehaven R.L.F.C., last years top try scorer Kieran Gill got off the mark with two tries whilst Chester Butler and George Flanagan both scored tries. Following the positive start to the season, the Bulls were brought back down to earth with a 32-16 loss to York Knights, winger David Foggin-Johnston, Jordan Lilley and vice captain Bodene Thompson all scored however it was not enough to prevent the Bulls first defeat of the season. Prop forward Masi Matongo was announced as the latest signing for the Bulls following a successful trial period from York Knights.

Milestones
 Round 1: Tom Holmes, Ben Blackmore, Michael Lawrence, Bodene Thompson, Brad Foster, Fenton Rodgers and Jack Walker made their debuts for the Bulls.
 Round 2: George Roby made his debut for the Bulls.
 Round 2: Bodene Thompson scored his 1st try for the Bulls.
 Round 3: Keven Appo made his debut for the Bulls.
 Round 3: Ben Blackmore and Tom Holmes scored their 1st try for the Bulls.
 Round 4: Josh Johnson made his debut for the Bulls.
 Round 4: Dec Patton reached 200 points for the Bulls.
 CCR3: Jayden Myers made his debut for the Bulls.
 CCR3: Keiran Gill scored his 2nd hat-trick for the Bulls.
 CCR3: Keven Appo, Brad Foster and Jayden Myers scored their 1st try for the Bulls.
 CCR3: Dec Patton kicked his 100th goal for the Bulls.
 CCR3: George Flanagan Jr kicked his 1st goal for the Bulls.
 Round 6: Leon Ruan made his debut for the Bulls.

Pre-season friendlies

Player appearances
 Friendly games only

 = Injured

 = Suspended

Table

RFL Championship

2023 Championship

Player appearances

 = Injured

 = Suspended

Challenge Cup

Player appearances

Squad statistics

 Appearances and points include (Championship, Challenge Cup and Play-offs) as of 19 March 2023.

Transfers

In

Out

Notes

Explanatory notes

Citations 

Bradford Bulls
Bradford Bulls seasons